The Melbourne International Comedy Festival (MICF) is the largest stand-alone comedy festival and the second-largest international comedy festival in the world. Established in 1987, it takes place annually in Melbourne over four weeks, typically starting in March and running through to April.  The Melbourne Town Hall has served as the festival hub, but performances are held in many venues throughout the city.

The MICF plays host to hundreds of local and international artists; in 2018 the festival listed over 550 shows, 6,700 performances (including more than 160 free performances) by 3,500 artists.  Although it is mainly a vehicle for stand-up and cabaret acts, the festival has also included sketch shows, plays, improvisational theatre, debates, musical shows and art exhibitions.  The televised Gala is one of the festival's flagship event, showcasing short performances from many headline and award-winning comics. Other popular events include The Great Debate, a televised comedy debate, the Opening Night Super Show, and Upfront, a night of performances exclusively featuring female comedians.

The Festival also produces three flagship development programs: Raw Comedy, Australia's biggest open mic competition; Class Clowns, a national comedy competition for high school students; and Deadly Funny, an Indigenous comedy competition that celebrates the unique humour of Indigenous Australians. The Festival also undertakes an annual national roadshow, showcasing festival highlights in regional towns across Australia.

History
The festival was launched in 1987 at a media conference hosted by Barry Humphries (as Sir Les Patterson) and Peter Cook. According to the festival's co-founder, John Pinder, the idea of holding an international comedy festival originated in the early 1980s.  In 1986, Pinder persuaded the Victorian Tourism Commission to fund an overseas trip in order to visit other international comedy festivals and investigate the possibility of holding a festival in Melbourne.  Pinder became convinced it would work, and after his return wrote a report for the state government, which they accepted. The following year, the first annual Melbourne International Comedy Festival launched.

Traditionally the festival would open on or around April Fool's Day (1 April), though it now generally begins in mid to late March and runs for roughly four weeks. Its first year, in 1987, featured 56 separate shows, including performances by the Doug Anthony All Stars, Wogs Out of Work, Gerry Connolly, Los Trios Ringbarkus and Rod Quantock.  By 1999, it contained over 120 shows and was being attended by some 350,000 patrons annually. In 2010, it played host to a record (at the time) 369 shows and 4,947 performances both local and international, including artists from the US, Canada, the UK, Ireland and China.  In addition, it achieved an attendance of over 508,000 and its highest-ever box office revenue of A$10.9  million, ranking it as Australia's largest cultural event. Activities were originally centred around the Universal and Athenaeum Theatres but in the early 1990s, the MICF shifted its venue to the newly refurbished Melbourne Town Hall, which has remained the festival hub.  Soon after this, it spread out further to include an independently produced program at the Melbourne Trades Hall as well. In 2010, for the first time, the Festival also ran the Trades Hall venue.

The MICF is one of the three largest international comedy festival in the world, behind Edinburgh's Fringe Festival and ahead of Montreal's Just For Laughs.

Although it is mainly a vehicle for stand-up and cabaret acts, its programme has also featured sketch shows, plays, improvisational theatre, debates, musical shows and art exhibitions. There is also a tradition for experimenting with unusual comedy venues, such as Rod Quantock's "Bus" tours and the similar "Storming Mount Albert By Tram", which used buses and trams respectively as mobile theatres in which the audience members were also passengers.

In 2006, the opening of the festival was delayed due to the Festival Melbourne that occurred as part of the 2006 Commonwealth Games held in Melbourne.

Following the end of the festival in Melbourne various local and international comedians join the MICF Roadshow, which spends several months touring regional Australia and in 2010, Singapore.

The 2020 festival was cancelled in its entirety due to concerns surrounding COVID-19 and the extension of restrictions relating to efforts to stem the spread of the pandemic in Australia.

Views on the festival
Australian comic Peter Helliar says that performing in Melbourne is more fun for comedians because there is less pressure involved than in Edinburgh, where there is greater competition to gain an audience. Journalist Simon Fanshawe describes Melbourne as "the festival where the comedians go to play ... the most relaxed, least fevered and probably the most audience-friendly of all the festivals."

Lorin Clarke, a Melbourne-based writer and director of comedy theatre, argues that shows self-produced by Australian comedians have great difficulty competing against shows featuring international comics which are produced by the Melbourne International Comedy Festival. Clarke argues this conflict of interest stifles creativity.

The festival is geared towards supporting local artists and has an approval process and higher registration fee for non-Australian or New Zealand artists.

Special events
In addition to over 200 nightly shows which play during the festival, there are a number of special one-off events.  The best-known of these is the Comedy Festival Gala, which showcases short acts from many headlines and award-winning comedians performing shows at that year's festival. It has become known as the festival's flagship event and typically sells out months in advance. It is typically hosted by well-known popular comedians. Headline acts at the Gala have included world-famous comics Arj Barker, Eddie Ifft, Adam Hills, Russell Kane, Stephen K Amos, Mike Wilmot and Rich Hall. The Gala is filmed and broadcast at a later date during the festival on the ABC. Since 1995 the Gala has been a charity event, with all proceeds from the live performance and the screening going to Oxfam Australia.

The Great Debate has been an annual event since 1989 and has been televised variously on Network Ten, Nine Network and currently airs on ABC. The comedy debate features two teams of comedians facing off loosely in the structure of a formal debate over humorous topics such as "Laughter is Better Than Sex", "Coming First is All That Matters" and "Food is better than sex".  The winning team is chosen by audience applause. Since 1994 the festival has produced Upfront, a night exclusively featuring female comedians which routinely sells out.

Awards
Each year, the MICF ends its Melbourne run by recognising the most outstanding shows and performers with a series of awards.  The award for the most outstanding show of the festival was called the Barry Award until the 2019 festival, named after Barry Humphries. However, due to comments about transgender people Humphries' name was removed from the prize and it was renamed the Melbourne International Comedy Festival Award.

The Piece of Wood Award was introduced in 1998 and is the comics' choice award.

The Best Newcomer Award is presented to the festival's best first-time performer as a part of its Emerging Talent Program.  The winner receives a trip to the Brighton comedy festival in the UK.

The Golden Gibbo, named in honour of Australian comedian Lynda Gibson, celebrates a local, independent act that "bucks trends and pursues the artist's idea more strongly than it pursues any commercial lure".

The Directors' Choice, has been presented since 2005 and recognises an outstanding show that missed out on any other prize.  It is awarded by the MICF director, in consultation with other visiting festival directors.

The Funny Tonne is awarded to the punter who sees the most shows throughout the Comedy Festival each year.

The Age Critics' Award was presented to the best local act as selected by reviewers at the Melbourne newspaper between 2001 and 2010.

A full list of all current and past Melbourne International Comedy Festival awards winners is listed on the MICF Awards website.

Advertising
From 1988 to 2018, cartoonist Michael Leunig designed the artwork for the festival program and other materials such as advertising posters. In 2019, Leunig was replaced by Judy Horacek following his recent controversial works on vaccines and marriage equality. Horacek will remain as the illustrator for the festival until at least 2020.

See also 
List of festivals in Australia
Edinburgh Festival Fringe
Just for Laughs
Martin Martini and the Bone Palace Orchestra

References

External links 
Official Melbourne International Comedy Festival site

Recurring events established in 1987
Comedy festivals in Australia
International Comedy Festival
1987 establishments in Australia
 Performing arts in Melbourne